The Domecq Palace, old Palace of Marqués de Montana (Spanish: Antiguo Palacio del Marqués de Montana) is a palace located in Jerez de la Frontera, Spain. It was declared Bien de Interés Cultural in 2002.

References 

Official Domecq Palace site

Buildings and structures in Jerez de la Frontera
Palaces in Andalusia
Bien de Interés Cultural landmarks in the Province of Cádiz